MELOS  (Mars Exploration of Life and Organism Search) is a Japanese rover mission concept under study for an engineering demonstration of precision landing, and to look for possible biosignatures on Mars using a rover. JAXA has not published updates since 2015.

History

Japan's aerospace agency (JAXA) started to develop the mission concept on 2008, when MELOS stood for "Mars Explorations with Landers and Orbiters" or "Mars Exploration with Lander-Orbiter Synergy" which included several landers to be deployed simultaneously, that were to study meteorology and atmospheric gas escape. The first MELOS concept would have consisted of an orbiter and up to 4 small landers; all elements would be launched together on the same rocket.  The orbiter would study the atmosphere, its and interactions with the solar wind, and image the current weather.  Each of the four stationary landers would have been deployed on pre-determined landing sites and perform different measurements:
Orbiter — Meteorology
Lander A — Surface 
Lander B — Astrobiology —This lander would analyze soil near a methane vent. The proposed method is to use fluorochrome dye and a microscope to stain and scan for proteins and cellular membranes. The target sensitivity would be 10 cells / 1 g of soil (compared to 104 cells / 1 g in Earth desert). It would also detect other organic biosignatures or biomolecules.
Lander C — Interior
Lander D — Sample return

By 2015, MELOS was down-scaled to a rover mission for an engineering demonstration, and possibly an aircraft. Under the latest concept, MELOS stands for "Mars Exploration of Life and Organism Search".

Rover
As of July 2015, the concept proposal includes a robotic rover whose primary objective is an engineering demonstration for long-range roving. Its secondary objective is science, specifically: meteorology, geology and astrobiology. The demonstration rover would use NASA's sky crane system for landing, and once on the surface, would deploy the MELOS rover.

Scientific objectives and payload
The scientific objectives of the mission include: 
Meteorology
 Basic meteorological observations, dust devil observation and dust entrainment. Payload: thermometer, anemometer, barometer. Optional instruments include: a spectroscope for methane detection, a dust particle sensor, electromagnetic & sonic wave measurement of dust, and short range LIDAR. 
Geology
 Geological description of the landing site including interior layered deposits and subsurface structure of regolith. Payload: ground penetrating radar (10-50m depth), multi-band stereo cameras (400-980 nm), VIS-NIR spectrometer (10ｰ20 nm). Optional: Geochronology Instrument (isochron dating method). 
Astrobiology
 Identification of biosignatures (current life from Mars or Earth).  Payload:  sample arm, fluorescence microscope (using pigments to visualize living cells), and an optional "daughter rover" to access samples in difficult places.

Aircraft

The mission concept also contemplates the optional deployment of a robotic airplane as a  flight technology demonstrator. It would have a wing span of 1.2 m, mass of 2.1 kg and would be released at an altitude of 16,400 feet (5 km) during the entry and landing event. Its only scientific payload would be a camera.

Proposed landing sites
The proposed landing sites will target 'wet' environments and include Valles Marineris (Melas Chasm and Juvantae Chasm), located near the confirmed recurring slope lineae, and Marte Vallis near dark slope streaks. 

Since the mission aims for access to a "special region", strict planetary protection sterilization protocols must be followed to prevent forward contamination of Earth microbes to Mars.

See also
Astrobiology
Akatsuki
Life on Mars
Nozomi - Mars flyby

References

Japanese space probes
Proposed space probes
Missions to Mars
Mars rovers
Japanese inventions
Proposed astrobiology space missions